Gréber or Greber may refer to:

Christian Greber (born 1972), Austrian former Olympic alpine skier
Henri-Léon Gréber (1854–1941), French sculptor, and medallist
Jacques Gréber (1882–1962), French architect specializing in landscape architecture and urban design
Jakob Greber (died 1731), German Baroque composer and musician
Johannes Greber (1874–1944), German Catholic priest, renounced his vows after attending a séance

See also
Boulevard Gréber (or Gréber Boulevard), a principal arterial road in Gatineau, Quebec
Greber Plan (1946–1950), a major urban plan developed for Canada's National Capital Region by Jacques Gréber